Frits Kiggen (born 10 September 1955) is a retired Dutch sidecarcross passenger and the 1981 World Champion in the sport, together with his driver Ton van Heugten.

He has also won the Dutch national sidecarcross championship twice, in 1979 and 1980, and the European amateur sidecarcross championship in 1975. Additionally, he has taken part in the Dakar Rally on a number of occasions.

Biography
Kiggen took out the 1975 IMBA European sideacrcross championship, an amateur competition, on the side of Jan Nouwens.

In 1982, he and Van Heugten took part in the Dakar Rally. He again took part in the competition in 2004, 2005 and 2007 in the truck category, for GINAF.

His racing partner of many years, Ton van Heugten, died on 27 March 2008 of a heart attack, aged 62, in his home town of Amersfoort.

Sidecarcross world championship results
Frits Kiggen made his debut in the European Championship, a predecessor of the World Championship, in 1976, in 1976, on the side of Broer Dirkx.

Kiggen did not return to this competition until 1979, now racing with Ton van Heugten, the two becoming a very successful combination. They won the Dutch championship twice together, in 1979 and 1980.

From 1980 onwards, the European championship was renamed the FIM World Championship and Van Heugten/Kiggen, finishing fourth in its first year, became the second World Champion in 1981, despite Kiggen, breaking his collar bone during the season and having to be replaced with Sies Hurkmans for four races.

Kiggen continued to race with Van Heugten until 1986, achieving four more top-three finishes in the World Championship. Kiggen also raced with other drivers in this time and finished his World Championship career on the side of Jan Bakens in 1988.

Season by season
The competition which was to become the sidecarcross world championship in 1980 originated as the FIM Cup in 1971 and was renamed to European championship in 1975. Kiggen's results in these competitions were:

Source:

Honours

World Championship
 Champions: (1) 1981
 Runners-up: (1) 1984

Netherlands
 Champions: (2) 1979, 1980

References

External links
 The official FIM website
 Pictures of Frits Kiggen's truck at the 2007 Dakar Rally

1955 births
Living people
Dutch sidecarcross riders
Dakar Rally drivers